Nason may refer to:

People
 Anne Nason (early 20th century), American golfer
 Ben Nason (born 1989), Australian rules football player
 Charles Geoffrey Nason Stanley, Irish Anglican Dean of Lismore (1934-60)
 David Nason (born 1970), American lawyer, president and CEO of GE Energy Financial Services
 Edward Nason West (1909–1990), Episcopal priest and fixture at the Cathedral of Saint John the Divine in New York
 Elias Nason (1811–1887), Massachusetts Congregational clergyman, educator, editor and author
 Emma Huntington Nason (1845–1921), American poet, author, and musical composer
 Ernest Nason Harmon (1894-1979), senior officer of the United States Army
 Frank Lewis Nason (1856–1928), American mining engineer and writer
 Geraldine Byrne Nason (born 1959), Irish diplomat, country's Permanent Representative to the UN
 Gertrude Nason (1890-1969), American painter and printmaker
 Guy Nason (born 1966), British statistician
 Henry Bradford Nason (1831–1895), American chemist
 Ithiel Nason (1839–1893), American-born businessman and political figure in British Columbia
 Jack Nason (1899–1977), American football player
 Joel F. Nason (1827–1908), American politician in Wisconsin
 John Nason (1889–1916), English cricketer
 Michael "Mike" Nason (born 1981), Canadian professional ice hockey coach and former professional player  
 Nicole Nason (born 1970), American lawyer, head of the National Highway Traffic Safety Administration 2006–08
 Pieter Nason (c.1612–1688/90), Dutch painter
 Riel Nason (fl. 21st century), Canadian novelist
 Robert Nason Beck (1928–2008), American scientist and a pioneer in the field of nuclear medicine
 Solomon Nason  (1825–1899), American pioneer and politician
 Stephen Nason (1901–1975), Church of England priest

Places
 Nason, Suriname, a village in Suriname
 Nason, Illinois, a city, United States
 Nason House, a historic house in Las Cruces, New Mexico, United States

See also
 Nasŏn (or Naseon), the South Korean name of Rason, a city in North Korea
 Nasonville, Rhode Island, an unincorporated community, United States
 Nasonville, Wisconsin, an unincorporated community, United States